The Princess Mary Christmas gift box was a brass or silver tin containing a number of gifts intended to be distributed to all members of the armed forces of the British Empire on Christmas day 1914, during World War I.

Princess Mary Christmas fund
Following the outbreak of the First World War in August 1914, the British Expeditionary Force was sent to the Western Front and was soon joined by troops from the Empire, those from India arriving before the end of the year. In October 1914, George V's 17-year-old daughter, Mary, Princess Royal, launched an appeal to fund every member of the armed forces receiving a Christmas gift. Shortly before Christmas 1914, advertisements were placed in the British press seeking donations for the "Soldiers and Sailors Christmas fund" and £152,691 was soon raised.

The boxes

The funding was used to manufacture small boxes made of silver for officers and brass for all others, however due to metal shortages in the later stages of the war some tins were made from plated base metals or alloys. Each tin was decorated with an image of Mary and other military and imperial symbols and typically filled with an ounce of tobacco, a packet of cigarettes in a yellow monogrammed wrapper, a cigarette lighter, and a Christmas card and photograph from Princess Mary. Some contained sweets, chocolates, and lemon drops.

Distribution
The boxes were originally intended for "every sailor afloat and every soldier at the front" on Christmas day 1914, but eligibility was soon extended to everyone "wearing the King's uniform on Christmas day". Whilst around 400,000 were delivered by Christmas, distribution was not completed until 1920 by which time approximately 2.5 million had been delivered.

References

 
World War I
Christmas traditions